The common name arctic aster may refer to two different plants of the genus Eurybia:

Eurybia merita, the subalpine aster
Eurybia sibirica, the Siberian aster